Littlemore Brook is a tributary of the River Thames in Oxfordshire, southern England. It runs from the Blackbird Leys estate in the city of Oxford behind the Kassam Stadium and through the Oxford Science Park to the south of the city, near the village of Littlemore after which it is named. It joins the Thames near Sandford-on-Thames.

The brook contains many species of fish such as chub, perch, roach, jack pike, dace and even brown trout. It is also habitat to bird such as heron, kingfisher, duck, and coots.

References

Rivers of Oxfordshire
Geography of Oxford
1Littlemore